This table of major ports and harbours on the Pacific Ocean can be sorted by continent, body of water or political jurisdiction.

Table

Gallery

See also

 Ports in China

Notes
 Port with a drydock
 North America Port Container Traffic 2006 Port Ranking by TEUs.

References

Pacific
Ports